El Paso is an unincorporated community and census-designated place (CDP) in southwestern White County, Arkansas, United States. It was first listed as a CDP in the 2020 census with a population of 267. Its name is Spanish for "the pass", referring to a small gap in the hills on the community's northern edge. Once known as Peach Orchard Gap in its early settlement, the origin of El Paso's Spanish name is unknown.

History
The historic Southwest Trail, a path used by most travelers entering Arkansas early in the 1800s, entered El Paso on today's Arkansas Highway 5 from Floyd, then headed to Gibson via Arkansas Highway 89, Tate's Mill Road and Batesville Pike Road. By the 1830s more than 80 percent of the Arkansas territory's population had entered through the Southwest Trail. The route is also known as the Old Military Road.

Geography
The center of El Paso is located at 35.13, -92.10.

Much of the community is situated along Bull Creek, and along Arkansas State Highway 5 and U.S. Highway 64. Lacking exact boundaries, the community is located within the borders of El Paso Township, within White County.

The closest city is Vilonia, approximately seven miles to the west of El Paso via U.S. 64. Beebe, where El Paso's children attend public schools, is about 13 miles to the east along this highway. Along Arkansas 5, Cabot is 15 miles to the south, and the unincorporated community of Romance is eight miles north.

Demographics

2020 census

Note: the US Census treats Hispanic/Latino as an ethnic category. This table excludes Latinos from the racial categories and assigns them to a separate category. Hispanics/Latinos can be of any race.

Economy
Vendors of tornado shelters, answering service and small gift items are among the cluster of businesses found at the intersection of the two major highways in El Paso. Many commuters typically pass through the small community, prompting the construction of, among other things, Sawbucks, a very popular family eating establishment, and a McDonald's restaurant since the late 1990s, due to unknown reasons, the McDonald's has been permanently closed as of March, 2023. El Paso also is the home of Rafter R Logistics, LLC and R & R Transportation Solutions, LLC.Most notably is the new CrossRoads Cowboy Church and 2 bar 2 Arena.

Education
El Paso is in the Beebe School District.

Notable person
Virginia Morris Johnson, the first woman to run for the office of governor of Arkansas was reared during her childhood in El Paso.

References

External links
 Demographic information on the El Paso ZIP code (72045) service area from the United States Census Bureau

Census-designated places in Arkansas
Census-designated places in White County, Arkansas
Unincorporated communities in Arkansas
Unincorporated communities in White County, Arkansas